Winston Churchill High School in San Antonio, Texas is part of the North East Independent School District.  It is named after Sir Winston Churchill, former Prime Minister of the United Kingdom. The school serves portions of the city of San Antonio along with the towns of Hill Country Village and Hollywood Park.

Churchill first opened for classes in 1966, funded by a 1960 school district bond that also established Roosevelt High School and the Blossom Athletic Center.

The school mascot is the Charger while the British Union Flag and lion are used as additional symbols.  The school was referenced in the 1996 movie Lone Star.

In 2017, the school was rated "Met Standard" by the Texas Education Agency, with a 3-Star Distinction for Academic Achievements in ELA/Reading, Science, and Social Studies. Churchill has been twice named a National Blue Ribbon School, in 1982-83 and again in 1999-2000. In 2012, Churchill was ranked 8th on  Children at Risk's Top 10 High Schools in Greater San Antonio.

Athletics
The football team won the 4A state championship in 1976.

The boys' basketball team won the 1982 5A state championship.

The boys' soccer program won the Texas State Championship in 1989, 1998, 2001, and 2003.

Notable alumni

 Trenton Estep, 2018 IMSA Porsche GT3 Cup Challenge Champion
 Glenn Blackwood, former NFL safety
 Lyle Blackwood, former NFL safety
 Abby Brammell, actress
 Cody Carlson, former NFL quarterback
 Randy Choate, MLB pitcher for the St. Louis Cardinals
 Josh Davis, swimmer, 3x Olympic Gold Medalist
 Steve Davis, former MLB pitcher for Toronto Blue Jays and Cleveland Indians
 Scott Dunn, former MLB player
 Jimmy Feigen, US Olympic swimmer
 Dimitri Flowers, Free Agent fullback
 Kimberly Friedmutter (Williams), model and actress, author.
 Callie Hernandez, actress
 Gary C. Kelly, business executive
 Derek Lee Nixon, actor
 Alan Palomo, creator of Neon Indian
 Pete Sessions, U.S. Congressman
 Alex Van Pelt, NFL player and coach
 Bill White, former Houston mayor, gubernatorial candidate

References

External links
 Churchill High School

High schools in San Antonio
North East Independent School District high schools
1966 establishments in Texas